Garsivaz (also Garsiwaz, Gersiwaz or Karsivaz) is a mythical Turanian character, referred to in Shahnameh ('Book of Kings') by the Persian epic-poet Ferdowsi. He is the brother of Afrasiab, king of Turan. He convinced his brother to kill Syavash, which in turn resulted in a number of battles between the Iranian and Afrasiab forces.

References 

Shahnameh characters